Loughborough Lake is a lake in Eastern Ontario, Canada.

Loon Island in the centre of the lake is privately owned by actor Dan Aykroyd.

See also
List of lakes in Ontario

References

Other map sources:

Lakes of Frontenac County